Kibdelosporangium lantanae is a bacterium from the genus Kibdelosporangium which has been isolated from soil from the plant Lantana camara in Xiamen, China.

References

Pseudonocardiales
Bacteria described in 2015